William Paden Mack (August 6, 1915 – January 15, 2003) was a vice admiral in the United States Navy. He was Superintendent of the United States Naval Academy in Annapolis, Maryland from June 16, 1972 to his retirement on August 1, 1975. He was a 1937 graduate of the Naval Academy. He was later a writer.

Personal life 
Mack's first wife was Ruth Mack (d.1996). Mack's second wife was Elsie Sutherlin Mack. Mack had two children, William and Margaret, and two step-children. On January 15, 2003, Mack died at home in Annapolis, Maryland.

References

Superintendents of the United States Naval Academy
United States Navy admirals
1915 births
2003 deaths
People from Hillsboro, Illinois
Military personnel from Illinois
20th-century American academics